Daniel Skarps (born August 24, 1976) is a Swedish Bandy player who currently plays for Bollnäs GIF as a versatile player.  Daniel was a youth product of Bollnäs GIF and is now in his third spell at the club after spells at other clubs.  

Daniel has played for:
 Bollnäs GIF (1993–1994)
 Edsbyns IF (1994–1995)
 Bollnäs GIF (1996–2000)
 Edsbyns IF (2000–2001)
 Gripen/Trollhättan BK (2001–2003)
 IF Vindhemspojkarna (2003–2004)
 Bollnäs GIF (2004–present)

External links
  daniel skarps at bandysidan
  bollnäs gif

Swedish bandy players
Living people
1976 births
Bollnäs GIF players
Edsbyns IF players
Gripen Trollhättan BK players
Ljusdals BK players